Tzurit Or is an Israeli-born, self-taught pastry chef and former film producer. She is the founder and creative force of the Tatte Bakery & Café located in the Greater Boston area and Washington, D.C.

Early life and film career 
Or grew up in Kvutzat Kinneret, a kibbutz in northern Israel located near the sea of Galilee. She grew up in a "baking family" and since she was very young, she has been baking.

From age 18 to 20, Or served her mandatory conscription in the Israeli Defense Forces. After serving in the army, Or studied film, management, and communications at Tel Aviv University. She went to work for an Israeli media company and worked as a film producer for 12 years. Her first projects were in commercials and then worked on documentaries, which she filmed around the world.

In 2003, Or emigrated to the United States and briefly lived in Los Angeles, California. She planned to return to Israel after a few years but stayed in the United States after becoming pregnant with her daughter, who wouldn't have been able to come with her back to Israel. Her then-husband got a job in Boston, so she moved across the country with him. She now lives in Brookline, Massachusetts.

Tatte Bakery & Café 

In 2007, Or began baking and cooking at her house for about 20 hours a day to sell her creations at a stand in Copley Square Farmer's Market in Boston. At her stand, she mainly sold brioche, cookies, and nut boxes, which were inspired by foods from her childhood in Israel.

The stand was widely popular, and in 2008, she opened the first Tatte Bakery & Café brick and mortar location in Brookline. Tatte, pronounced like "latte," sells a wider variety of items than she sold at the stand. 

In 2016, founder of Panera Bread and Au Bon Pain, Ron Shaich, bought a 50.01% stake in Tatte. , there are 31 Tatte locations in both Massachusetts and in Washington, D.C.

In July 2020, she stepped down as CEO following discrimination complaints, but she still remains involved in the bakery's operations and serves as its chief baker.

References 

Living people
People from Northern District (Israel)
21st-century American businesswomen
21st-century American businesspeople
People from Brookline, Massachusetts
Jewish American chefs
Israeli women film producers
Businesspeople from Boston
1972 births
Israeli emigrants to the United States